Avram Petronijević (13 September 1791 – 22 April 1852) was a Serbian politician serving as Minister of Foreign Affairs of the Principality of Serbia on several terms and holding the longest term by one Prime Minister in the political history of Serbia.

Biography
Petronijević was born in Tekija, and was educated in a school in the neighboring Orşova (Romania). In 1817 he returned to Serbia to pursue a political career and soon became the personal secretary of Prince Miloš Obrenović. He was a member of the Serbian deputation in Constantinople from 1821 until 1826, and later several times a Serbian deputy (ćehaja) at the Turkish government (Sublime Porte). Later, with Toma Vučić-Perišić, Dimitrije Davidović, Aleksa Simić, Stojan Simić, Milutin Savić, Ilija Garašanin, Petronijević stood at the head of Ustavobranitelji (Defenders of the Constitution against the Prince Prince Miloš Obrenović. During the reign of Prince Alexander Karađorđevic, starting from 1844 until his death he was Minister of Foreign Affairs and Representative of the Prince (Prime Minister). He died in Tsargrad on 22 April 1852 (Julian Calendar) and was buried in the church of St. Petka on the Bosporus, next to Samuilo Jakovljević, a colleague from the Serbian deputation in Constantinople from 1821 until 1826, though Jakovljević died in 1824.

References

External links

Biography of  Avram Petronijević 
Avram Petronijević
„Radovan Kalabić: Avram Petronijević (1791-1852)“

1791 births
1852 deaths
Prime Ministers of Serbia
Government ministers of Serbia
Foreign ministers of Serbia